Jacob Vittrup "Taz" Sørensen (born 12 February 1983) is a Danish football player in the midfielder position, who plays for Danish club Vejle Boldklub. He has played 42 games and scored five goals for various Danish national youth selections, including 19 games and two goals for the Denmark national under-21 football team, and he represented Denmark at the 2000 European Under-17 Championship and 2006 European Under-21 Championship tournaments.

Club career
Sørensen started his senior career with Aalborg BK in the top-flight Danish Superliga championship. He made his Superliga debut for Aalborg in April 2001, and went on to play 95 league games and score five league goals for Aalborg until October 2005 For the second half of the 2005–06 Superliga season, Sørensen was loaned out to Superliga relegation battlers SønderjyskE. He played 13 league games for the club, but could not prevent SønderjyskE from being relegated at the end of the season.

In the summer 2006, Sørensen moved abroad to play for Odd Grenland in the Norwegian Premier League, signing a three-and-a-half-year contract. He and Odd Grenland was relegated to the secondary Norwegian First Division in 2008, but Sørensen stayed at the club and helped Odd Grenland win promotion for the Premier League by winning the 2008 First Division season. In December 2009, after finishing fourth with Odd Grenland in the 2009 Premier League season, Sørensen moved to league rival Haugesund FK, where he joined fellow Dane Allan Olesen.

International career
Sørensen made his international debut for the Danish national under-17 team in March 2000, and he played two games for the team at the 2000 European Under-17 Championship. He went on to play 20 games and score three goals for the under-19 and under-20 Danish youth selections. He made his debut for the Danish national under-21 team in September 2004, and played three games for the team at the 2006 European Under-21 Championship.

Career statistics

References

External links
 Danish national team profile
 Vejle BK profile
 

1983 births
Living people
Danish men's footballers
Sportspeople from Aalborg
Denmark youth international footballers
Denmark under-21 international footballers
AaB Fodbold players
SønderjyskE Fodbold players
Odds BK players
FK Haugesund players
Vejle Boldklub Kolding players
Expatriate footballers in Norway
Eliteserien players
Norwegian First Division players
Danish Superliga players
Danish 1st Division players
Danish expatriate men's footballers
Association football midfielders